Digalkandi Union is a union of Ghatail Upazila, Tangail District, Bangladesh. It is situated 8 km south of Ghatail and 27 km north of Tangail, The District Headquarter.

Demographics

According to Population Census 2011 performed by Bangladesh Bureau of Statistics, The total population of Digalkandi union is 29829. There are  households 7649 in total.

Education

The literacy rate of Digalkandi Union is 48.2% (Male-50.8%, Female-45.9%).

See also
 Union Councils of Tangail District

References

Populated places in Dhaka Division
Populated places in Tangail District
Unions of Ghatail Upazila